Alex Prentice (4 July 1879 – 20 June 1914) was an Australian rules footballer who played for the Carlton Football Club in the Victorian Football League (VFL).

Notes

External links 
		
Alex Prentice's profile at Blueseum

1879 births
1914 deaths
Australian rules footballers from Victoria (Australia)
Carlton Football Club players